Saigon Tax Trade Center was a department store in District 1 of Ho Chi Minh City, Vietnam. It was located at 135 Nguyen Hue Street, at the junction with Le Loi, in Bến Nghé ward.  It closed in late September 2014 for redevelopment.

The building was originally built in 1924 as the Grands Magasins Charner department store.

References

External links
 Saigon Tax Trade Centre

Economy of Ho Chi Minh City